Volodymyr Braila (born 21 August 1978) is a Ukrainian footballer.

External links 

1978 births
Living people
Sportspeople from Kryvyi Rih
Ukrainian footballers
Ukraine student international footballers
FC Sportinvest Kryvyi Rih players
FC Dynamo-2 Kyiv players
FC Nyva Vinnytsia players
FC Mariupol players
FC Illichivets-2 Mariupol players
SC Tavriya Simferopol players
FC Ihroservice Simferopol players
FC Shakhtar Makiivka players
FC Vorskla Poltava players
FC Krymteplytsia Molodizhne players
FC Hoverla Uzhhorod players
FC Oleksandriya players
Ukrainian Premier League players
Ukrainian First League players
Ukrainian Second League players
Ukrainian Amateur Football Championship players
Association football midfielders